"Missing Cleveland" is the first single from American rock musician Scott Weiland's second solo album, "Happy" in Galoshes. The single was released on November 11, 2008. In the United States, the song peaked at number 28 on the Modern Rock Chart.

The music video for "Missing Cleveland" was directed by Kevin Kerslake, who had worked with Weiland before. The video has been posted on YouTube.com for viewers to see.

Chart performance

References

2008 singles
Scott Weiland songs
Songs written by Scott Weiland
2008 songs
Songs written by Doug Grean